Holmesville is a village in Holmes County, Ohio, United States, along Killbuck Creek. The population was 372 at the 2010 census.

Holmesville was platted in 1836, and named for its location with Holmes County.

Geography
Holmesville is located at  (40.629448, -81.922211).

Demographics

2010 census
As of the census of 2010, there were 372 people, 146 households, and 107 families living in the village. The racial makeup of the village was 98.7% White, 0.3% Asian, and 1.1% from two or more races. Hispanic or Latino of any race were 0.3% of the population.

There were 146 households, of which 32.2% had children under the age of 18 living with them, 51.4% were married couples living together, 13.7% had a female householder with no husband present, 8.2% had a male householder with no wife present, and 26.7% were non-families. 22.6% of all households were made up of individuals, and 9.5% had someone living alone who was 65 years of age or older. The average household size was 2.55 and the average family size was 2.92.

The median age in the village was 36 years. 23.4% of residents were under the age of 18; 8.8% were between the ages of 18 and 24; 27.1% were from 25 to 44; 28% were from 45 to 64; and 12.6% were 65 years of age or older. The gender makeup of the village was 49.7% male and 50.3% female.

2000 census
As of the census of 2000, there were 386 people, 151 households, and 104 families living in the village. The population density was 1,617.4 people per square mile (621.0/km2). There were 159 housing units at an average density of 666.2 per square mile (255.8/km2). The racial makeup of the village was 97.93% White, 0.52% Native American, 1.30% from other races, and 0.26% from two or more races. Hispanic or Latino of any race were 2.33% of the population.

There were 151 households, out of which 31.8% had children under the age of 18 living with them, 51.0% were married couples living together, 11.9% had a female householder with no husband present, and 30.5% were non-families. 27.2% of all households were made up of individuals, and 12.6% had someone living alone who was 65 years of age or older. The average household size was 2.56 and the average family size was 3.07.

In the village, the population was spread out, with 24.1% under the age of 18, 9.6% from 18 to 24, 30.1% from 25 to 44, 23.1% from 45 to 64, and 13.2% who were 65 years of age or older. The median age was 38 years. For every 100 females, there were 108.6 males. For every 100 females age 18 and over, there were 96.6 males.

The median income for a household in the village was $37,375, and the median income for a family was $39,375. Males had a median income of $27,396 versus $17,679 for females. The per capita income for the village was $13,314. About 3.8% of families and 6.4% of the population were below the poverty line, including 1.7% of those under age 18 and 18.2% of those age 65 or over.

References

Villages in Ohio
Villages in Holmes County, Ohio
Amish in Ohio